Colobothea pimplaea is a species of beetle in the family Cerambycidae. It was described by Bates in 1865. It is known from Brazil, French Guiana, and Peru.

References

pimplaea
Beetles described in 1865